Rose-Marie Holm (born 6 August 1953) is a Swedish gymnast. She competed in five events at the 1968 Summer Olympics.

References

External links
 

1953 births
Living people
Swedish female artistic gymnasts
Olympic gymnasts of Sweden
Gymnasts at the 1968 Summer Olympics
People from Landskrona Municipality
Sportspeople from Skåne County
20th-century Swedish women